Robert King (born 27 June 1960 in Wombourne) is an English conductor, harpsichordist, editor and author. His career has concentrated on period performance of classical music, in particular from the baroque and early modern periods. In 2007, he was convicted of fourteen charges of indecent assault, some against minors, and jailed. Following his release, he resumed his musical career.

Career

As a youth, he was a member of the Choir of St John's College, Cambridge. He read music at St John's College, Cambridge and in 1980, while still a student, founded the period instrument orchestra The King's Consort. As conductor and artistic director of The King's Consort, King has made more than 100 recordings, mostly for Hyperion Records.

He has worked as a conductor with orchestras in Europe and North America, including the Seattle, Houston, New World, Oregon, Detroit, Atlanta, Minnesota, WDR and NDR Symphony Orchestras, the Bergen Philharmonic, the Munich Radio Orchestra, Zurich Chamber Orchestra, Danish National Radio Orchestra, Orchestre Philharmonique de Monte Carlo, the Orchestra della RAI Torino, Orchestra Sinfonica Giuseppe Verdi di Milano, the Orquesta Sinfónica de Tenerife, Orquesta Ciudad de Barcelona, Real Filharmonia de Galicia, Real Orquesta Sinfónica de Sevilla and the Orquesta e Coro Ciudad de Madrid. As a choral conductor, King has worked with the Nederlands Kamerkoor, Orfeo Catala, Orfeón Donostiarra, Swiss Radio Choir and the BBC Singers. Operatic work has included Handel Ottone in Japan and the UK, Handel Ezio in Paris, Purcell The Indian Queen in the UK and Germany, Purcell The Fairy Queen in Spain and Britain and Gluck Armide for Buxton Festival. He has written and presented for the BBC, been artistic director of music festivals in Sweden, Germany, and the UK, and contributed to the scores of a number of Hollywood films including Pirates of the Caribbean, Shrek 2, Flushed Away, and The Da Vinci Code.

Besides his work in the field of baroque music, King has conducted a wide spread of classical and early romantic works, symphonic and choral, with a particular focus on the music of Mozart, Haydn and Mendelssohn, and a continuing specialisation in early twentieth century English composers, notably the works of Vaughan Williams, Stanford and Parry.

Following a custodial sentence in 2007 for the sexual abuse of minors, King made a return to the podium in 2009. Having recorded mostly for Hyperion Records prior to his conviction, since 2013 he has recorded for his own label, Vivat, whose debut recording, I Was Glad, reached number 1 in the UK Specialist Classical Albums Chart and was a finalist in the 2013 Gramophone Awards.

A published author and editor of many scores, principally of baroque music, King wrote a monograph, ‘Henry Purcell - "A Greater Musical Genius England Never had"‘ (London: Thames & Hudson) published in 1995, coinciding with the 300th anniversary of the composer's death in 1695. In 2010 and 2011, two volumes of English church music edited by King were published by Oxford University Press, joining nearly 100 other works he has edited from the Baroque and Classical eras.

He was formerly with the agency HarrisonParrott.

Indecent assault convictions

In 2007, King was convicted of fourteen charges of indecent assault for the sexual assault of five boys, three under the age of sixteen, between 1982 and 1995; he was acquitted on another charge. King received a custodial sentence of 3 years 9 months and was placed on the sex offenders' register for life. During the case, King denied the abuse, describing the boys as "absolute liars".

Following his sentence, King was not prohibited from working with children. In 2013, commenting after criticism for his taking part in a charity fundraising concert, King stated that he had 'accepted my sentence, and have paid my debt to society'.

Personal life 

At the time of his conviction, King was married, with a young child.

Published works
Henry Purcell - "A Greater Musical Genius England Never had". London: Thames & Hudson, 1995. 
English Church Music. Volume 1: Anthems and Motets. Oxford: Oxford University Press, 2010. 
English Church Music. Volume 2: Canticles and Responses. Oxford: Oxford University Press, 2011.

Discography
Founded in 1980 by Robert King, the period instrument orchestra and choir The King's Consort has made more than 100 recordings under King's direction, winning many international awards  and selling more than 1,500,000 copies.

Collections

References

External links

1960 births
Alumni of St John's College, Cambridge
Living people
English people convicted of indecent assault
English people convicted of child sexual abuse
British performers of early music
Founders of early music ensembles
English choral conductors
British male conductors (music)
Music directors (opera)
20th-century British conductors (music)
21st-century British conductors (music)
20th-century English criminals
21st-century British male musicians
20th-century male musicians